Clawson is an unincorporated community in Angelina County, in the U.S. state of Texas. According to the Handbook of Texas, it had a population of 195 in 2000. It is located within the Lufkin, Texas micropolitan area.

History
Clawson was established as a sawmill community in the 1880s and eventually became a rail shipping point for the St. Louis Southwestern Railway around 1890. The community was named after T.W. Clawson, who managed the first mill in the community. A larger sawmill was built in the community after it was sold to a man named Jack Caruthers. Businesses in Clawson around 1890 included a commissary that sold general merchandise, a post office, a church, and tenant houses for mill employees. After Caruthers went bankrupt, there were many other lumber companies that operated in Clawson. They included Grambling and Clark in 1902, the Henderson Sand and Lumber Company in the early 20th century, and the Pine Island Lumber Company, which was founded by Caruthers' sons. They sold the mill to J.M. Burnett and Ashley Stroud in 1907, who then sold it to J.H. Bivins and E.E. Blythe. The sawmill industry in Clawson came to an end sometime around 1911 when Bivins and Blythe closed it down. Clawson had less than 100 residents before 1904 but had a money order post office in operation. The population grew to 250 at its sawmilling zenith in 1910. It went down to 150 in 1914 and 1915 and developed telephone service. The population remained the same in 1925 and grew to 195 from the end of the 1960s through 2000. After its post office closed, mail was delivered to Clawson from Lufkin since 1926.

The Angelina and Neches River Railroad also traveled through the community. On January 4, 1946, an F3 tornado struck Clawson, destroying 30 homes and three people having been killed.

Geography

Education
Clawson had its own school around 1890. Today, the community is served by the Central Independent School District.

References

Unincorporated communities in Angelina County, Texas
Unincorporated communities in Texas